The ninth season of the X Factor Romania talent show premiered September 11, 2020. Delia Matache and Ștefan Bănică Jr. kept their roles as judges while Loredana Groza and X Factor (Romanian season 3) winner, Florin Ristei, were the two new judges of the talent show. Răzvan Simion and Dani Oțil, the presenters of the morning show Neatza cu Răzvan și Dani returned as the show's hosts after an absence of one season. Crina Mardare was the only vocal coach of the season.

The aspiring artists were able to register online on the site of the show. From these, the producer selected the artists who are to enter the audition stage. This season had the motto #deneoprit due to the fact that the whole show is filmed during the COVID-19 pandemic.

Categories 
Colour key:
  Winner
  Runner-up
  Eliminated in the Semifinal
  Eliminated in the Duels
  Eliminated in the Bootcamp
  Wildcard

Auditions 
Auditions took place in Bucharest only, because of the COVID-19 pandemic. Filming started on July 7, 2020.

According to the X Factor Romania - the ninth season regulations, each judges was assigned a category to mentor.

 Boys between the ages of 14 and 24 - Loredana Groza
 Girls between the ages of 14 and 24 - Ștefan Bănică Jr.
 Artists over the age of 24 (mixed) - Delia Matache
 Groups - Florin Ristei

Each judge had the right to one vote for each contestant with: "YES" or "NO". Those who received 4 YES-es were advanced directly to the next stage. Those with 3 YES-es were put on the short list of the judge that  mentored their category. The judge that mentored the groups category had the opportunity to form groups after the auditions; he could ask for each artist that received 3 YES-es. The judge that mentored the category of the respective artists decided if he will keep them in his category or if he will leave them for the group category.

Each judge completed his team with 10 artists/musical acts.

Episode 1 (September 11)

Episode 2 (September 18)

Episode 3 (September 25)

Episode 4 (October 2)

Episode 5 (October 9)

Episode 6 (October 16)

Episode 7 (October 23)

Episode 8 (October 30)

Episode 9 (November 6)

Episode 10 (November 12)

Episode 11 (November 13)

Episode 12 (November 19)

Episode 13 (November 20)

Systematized auditions summary

Boys 

Advanced automatically with 4 YES-es
 Theodor Andrei
 Robert Botezan
 Denis Costea
 Arthur Horeanu
 Eden Loren
 Adrian Petrache
 Iulian Selea
 David Adrian Ștefan

Advanced through the short list with 3 YES-es
 Kashy (Gabi Gruici)
 Liviu Panait

Girls 

Advanced automatically with 4 YES-es
 Ioana Ardelean
 Andra Barangă
 Melania Cuc
 Andreea Dobre
 Ana Paula Rada Pantea
 Andrada Precup
 Alexandra Sîrghi
 Oana Velea
 Marta Verrecchia

Advanced through the short list with 3 YES-es
 Marina Vlad

Groups 

Advanced automatically with 4 YES-es
 Diana & Ioana Conta
 Oana & George Indru
 Super 4
 Hello (Teodora & Marian)
 Trio Eva

Advanced through the short list with 3 YES-es
 West Vlads (Vlad Erdei & Vlad Moigrădeanu)

Formed by Ristei consisting of 3 YES-es contestants rejected by the mentor of their original category
 4SURE (Vasi Bistrae, Zoran Demian, Marian Vasilesc & Mistah White)
 It's US! (Chriss Casper & Daria Pintilie)
 RB Queens (Cristina Gheorghe, Anne Laura Noupadja, Cristina Vasiu)
 Tiny Tigers (Alexandra Căpitănescu, Bianca Ionescu, Carla Ioniță, Karina Ștefan)

Over 24s 

Advanced automatically with 4 YES-es
 Iulian Canaf
 Alina Dincă
 Mehmet Dural
 Otilia Gogu
 Naomi Hedman
 Austin Hirth
 Lakeetra Knowles
 Sonia Mosca
 Kalon Rae

Advanced through the short list with 3 YES-es
 Mihai Meiroș

Bootcamp
Each judge completed its team with 10 artists. In case the judges did not have enough contestants in their teams who passed automatically with 4 YES-es, they had to choose from those with 3 YES-es from their short list.

In the bootcamp, each contestant performed a song and only 3 artists per category were advanced.

Episode 14 − Boys (November 26)
Color key
 – Contestant was immediately eliminated after performance without switch
 – Contestant was switched out later in the competition and eventually eliminated
 – Contestant was not switched out and made the final three of their own category

Episode 15 − Girls (November 27)

Episode 16 − Groups (December 3)

Episode 17 − Over 24s (December 4)

Duels: Episode 18 (December 10)
Two acts per category were advanced, while one act per category was eliminated by the mentor of the respective category.

Color key
 – The act was eliminated.
 – The act was advanced.

Semifinal: Episode 19 (December 11)
Only one act per category was advanced, while the other was eliminated by the mentor of the respective category.

Color key
 – The act was eliminated.
 – The act was advanced.

Goofs, critics and controversies
Auditions
 When asked if he had participated in such a show before, Lucian Pință said no. He actually participated in the show Cântă acum cu mine, the Romanian version of All Together Now and Falsez pentru tine, the Romanian version of I Can See Your Voice. (Episode 2)
  was actually 13 years old when she auditioned, therefore, she had not even reached the minimum age of 14 for the participation in the show. (Episode 7)
Bootcamp
 Both Arthur Horeanu and Kashy (Gabi Gruici) criticized the way their Bootcamp performances were edited. Arthur by adding a comment on the post on Facebook of his performance on the official X Factor Romania page saying: "From the stage I heard differently and I know how I sang. Re-listening to the recording, however, I detected some corrections and compressions that did not benefit me (one is obvious at 1:03), and the shortening of the song somewhat ruined its flow." and Kashy posting an Instagram story from rehearsals saying: "It kind of sounds better here". (Episode 14)

eXtra Factor 
The ninth season of the talent show had a companion series titled eXtra Factor. The show's presenter was the actress Ilona Brezoianu, known for the role of secretary Flori from the comedy series Mangalița and the episodes were weekly published on YouTube. The first episode premiered September 11, 2020 on Kaufland Romania's YouTube channel.

Ratings

References

X Factor (Romanian TV series)
Romania 09
2020 Romanian television seasons
Antena 1 (Romania) original programming